The 2009 CONCACAF U-20 Championship was the biannual CONCACAF youth championship tournament for under-20 national teams. The 2009 edition was held in Trinidad and Tobago. All matches were played at Dwight Yorke Stadium in Bacolet, Tobago and Marvin Lee Stadium in Macoya, Trinidad. The CONCACAF U-20 Championship traditionally serves as the CONCACAF qualifier for the FIFA U-20 World Cup, and under the 2009 tournament format the four semifinalists qualified for the 2009 FIFA U-20 World Cup, which was hosted by Egypt from 25 September to 16 October 2009.

Qualifying

Notes
 † Trinidad and Tobago automatically qualified and did not participate in the qualification tournament due to their status as tournament hosts.
 ‡ The runner up from the Caribbean region, Saint Vincent and the Grenadines, and the 3rd-place finisher from the Central American region, Honduras, played a playoff to determine the 8th and final qualifier for the tournament proper. The match was a one-game playoff on 2 March, four days prior to the opening of the tournament, in Macoya. Honduras won the match 3–1.

Squads

Venues

Group stage
The winner and runner-up from each group advanced to the semifinals.

Group 1

All matches in this group were played at Dwight Yorke Stadium in Bacolet, Trinidad.

Group 2

All matches in this group were played at Marvin Lee Stadium in Macoya, Tobago.

Championship round
All four teams to qualify for the semifinals automatically qualified for the 2009 FIFA U-20 World Cup.

Semifinals

Third place

Final

Goalscorers

3 goals

  Randy Edwini-Bonsu
  Josué Martínez
  Roger Rojas

1 goal

  Jorge Castro
  Diego Estrada
  Marco Ureña
  Léster Blanco
  Andrés Flores
  Herbert Sosa
  Cristhian Altimirano
  Johnny Leverón
  Mario Martínez
  José Valladares
  Reinieri Mayorquín
  Alonso Adlam
  Romario Campbell
  Antonio Salazar
  Axel Velasquez
  Juma Clarence
  Sean De Silva
  Qian Grosvenor
  Uriah Bentick
  Dilly Duka
  Perica Marošević
  Billy Schuler
  Brek Shea
  Tony Taylor

Final ranking

Note: Per statistical convention in football, matches decided in extra time are counted as wins and losses, while matches decided by penalty shoot-out are counted as draws.

See also
 CONCACAF Under-20 Championship
 2009 FIFA U-20 World Cup

References

External links
 Official CONCACAF U-20 homepage
 Official FIFA U-20 World Cup: Egypt 2009 homepage

 
2009
Under
2009 in Trinidad and Tobago football
2009
2009 in youth association football